Blaine Township is a township in Bottineau County in the U.S. state of North Dakota. Its population during the 2000 Census was 30, and an estimated 27 people as of 2009.

History
Blaine Township was organized in 1904.

Geography
Blaine Township is located in Southwest Bottineau County in survey township T160 North, Range 83 West. The nearest cities are Mohall to the northwest and Lansford to the south.

Demographics
The 2000 Census reported there were 30 people, 10 households, and 8 families residing in the township. The racial makeup of the township was 100% White. Norwegians (38.5%) and Germans (35.9%) made up the largest two ancestry groups in the township.

Of the 10 households in the township, 40% had children under the age of 18 living with them. married couples made up 60% of the population. Two households (20%) were a non-family households. The average household size was 3.00 people.

Nearly 87% of the township was under the age of 65 at the 2000 Census, with children under the age of 18 making up 40% of the population. The largest group was 45- to 64-year-olds, with 23.3%, followed by 25- to 44-year-olds (20%) and those over 65 (13.3%). Just 3.3% of the population was made up of 18- to 24-year-olds. The median age was 35.5 years.

The median household income for the township was $32,500, and the median family income was $26,875. Per capita income in the township was $13,155.

References

External links
 U.S. Census map of Blaine Township as of the 2000 Census

Townships in Bottineau County, North Dakota
Populated places established in 1904
1904 establishments in North Dakota
Townships in North Dakota